Daoulas is a commune in the Finistère department of Brittany in north-western France.

Population
Inhabitants of Daoulas are called in French Daoulasiens.

Breton language
In 2008, 9.82% of primary-school children attended bilingual school bilingual schools, where Breton language is taught alongside French.

See also
Communes of the Finistère department
List of works of the two Folgoët ateliers
Parc naturel régional d'Armorique

References

External links

Official website

Mayors of Finistère Association 

Communes of Finistère